The Ebro Treaty was a treaty signed in 226 BC by Hasdrubal the Fair of Carthage and the Roman Republic, which fixed the river Ebro in Iberia as the boundary between the two powers of Rome and Carthage. Under the terms of the treaty, Carthage would not expand north of the Ebro, as long as Rome likewise did not expand to the south of the river.

The exact date is unknown, but some time after 226 BC, Rome became affiliated with the town of Saguntum south of the Ebro River. Polybius tells us that the Carthaginian general Hannibal had been looking for a pretext for war. After briefly consulting with the Carthaginian senate, Hannibal proceeded to besiege Saguntum, which resulted in an eight-month siege. The Roman senate upon hearing of the siege immediately sent embassies to consult with Hannibal and then with the Carthaginian senate. Initially the Roman embassies demanded that Carthage hand over Hannibal for attacking a Roman ally, which the Carthaginians refused. The Carthaginian senate stated that it was the Saguntines that began the war, and that the Romans had no grounds on which to accuse the Carthaginians.

The Romans were unable to come to the aid of Saguntum before the town fell in 219 BC.  After Saguntum fell the Romans made preparations for war and sent a second embassy to Carthage. The Roman envoys demanded that Carthage hand over Hannibal and any others responsible for the attack on Saguntum. Livy states that this second embassy was sent simply to follow the formalities of officially declaring war; meaning that the Romans fully anticipated a renewed war with Carthage.  Both Livy and Polybius discuss the argument between the second Roman embassy and the Carthaginian senate before the declaration of war was made.

It was at this point that the Carthaginian senate refused to acknowledge the Ebro treaty and also refused to hand over Hannibal to the Romans.  The Carthaginians are said to have compared this treaty to the one made between Catulus and Hamilcar Barca in 241 BC. Here the Carthaginians argued that the Roman people refused to accept the treaty made between the two generals because it had not been ratified by the people.  The Roman envoys refused to accept this argument, and unable to come to an agreement war was declared in 218 BC. The ensuing conflict is now known as the Second Punic War, which lasted until 201 BC.

See also
The Treaty with Saguntum, T. A. Dorey, http://www.uc.pt/fluc/eclassicos/publicacoes/ficheiros/humanitas11-12/01_Torey.pdf
List of treaties
Casus belli

References

Bagnall, Nigel. The Punic Wars: Rome, Carthage, and the Struggle for the Mediterranean. New York: Thomas Dunne Books, 1990. 

Second Punic War
Peace treaties
Treaties of the Roman Republic
226 BC
3rd-century BC treaties
Treaties of Carthage
3rd century BC in the Roman Republic
Treaties of ancient Rome